Mads Pedersen (born 14 February 1990) is a Danish badminton player.

Achievements

European Junior Championships 
Boys' doubles

BWF International Challenge/Series 
Men's doubles

Mixed doubles

  BWF International Challenge tournament
  BWF International Series tournament
  BWF Future Series tournament

References

External links 
 
 

1990 births
Living people
Danish male badminton players